Hayfield, Virginia is the name of:

 Hayfield, Fairfax County, Virginia
 Hayfield, Frederick County, Virginia